International Crimes Tribunal or International Criminal Tribunal may refer to:
 International Crimes Tribunal (Bangladesh)
 International Criminal Tribunal for the former Yugoslavia (ICTY)
 International Criminal Tribunal for Rwanda (ICTR)
 various ones for crimes against humanity, see Crimes against humanity

See also
 International Criminal Court
 International Court of Justice
 World Court (disambiguation)
 ICT (disambiguation)